Lew Hoad and Ken Rosewall were the defending champions, but lost in the semifinals to Vic Seixas and Tony Trabert.

Rex Hartwig and Mervyn Rose defeated Seixas and Trabert in the final, 6–4, 6–4, 3–6, 6–4 to win the gentlemen's doubles tennis title at the 1954 Wimbledon Championship.

Seeds

  Rex Hartwig /  Mervyn Rose (champions)
  Vic Seixas /  Tony Trabert (final)
  Lew Hoad /  Ken Rosewall (semifinals)
  Gardnar Mulloy /  Budge Patty (semifinals)

Draw

Finals

Top half

Section 1

Section 2

Bottom half

Section 3

Section 4

References

External links

Men's Doubles
Wimbledon Championship by year – Men's doubles